Elongation factor 1-beta is a protein that in humans is encoded by the EEF1B2 gene.

Function 

This gene encodes a translation elongation factor. The protein is a guanine nucleotide exchange factor involved in the transfer of aminoacylated tRNAs to the ribosome. Alternative splicing results in three transcript variants which differ only in the 5' UTR.

Interactions 

EEF1B2 has been shown to interact with EEF1G and HARS.

References

Further reading